Vladykina Gora is a rural locality (a village) in Chushevitskoye Rural Settlement, Verkhovazhsky District, Vologda Oblast, Russia. The population was 100 as of 2002.

Geography 
Vladykina Gora is located 51 km southwest of Verkhovazhye (the district's administrative centre) by road. Spirino is the nearest rural locality.

References 

Rural localities in Verkhovazhsky District